Claire Specht Fejes (Dec 14,1920 – October 1998) was an American artist.

Early life 
She born in New York to parents from Poland and Austria.

Education and career 
She trained in anatomy, stone-carving, and sculpture at the Newark Museum, Newark Fine Arts School, and the Students' Art League through the Works Progress Administration.

She married Joe Fejes in 1942 and moved with him to Fairbanks, Alaska in 1946 where her husband took up gold mining.
Fejes sketched and painted Alaska Native people, Inupiat and Athabascans. She also wrote books about her travels and life in Alaska. They had a son, Mark (also an artist), and a daughter, Yolande.

Her work is held in several museums, including the Anchorage Museum, Frye Art Museum, the University of Michigan Museum of Art, the Blanton Museum of Art, the Anchorage Museum, the University of Alaska Museum of the North, and the National Portrait Gallery. Her artwork is also on display at the Fairbanks North Start Borough Public Library.

Later life 
In her last decade, Fejes spent her winters in New York City and San Diego, and her summers in Fairbanks.

Bibliography
 Cold Starry Night: An Alaskan Memoir. 1996. Epicenter Press.
 Enuk My Son. 1969. Pantheon Books.
 The Eskimo Storyteller. 1999. Edwin S. Hall, illustrated by Claire Fejes. University of Alaska Press.
 People of the Noatak. 1966. Alfred A. Knopf. 1994, re-released by Volcano Press.
 The Villagers: Athabaskan Indian Life Along the Yukon River. 1981. Random House.

References

External links
 The Alaska House Art Gallery
 UA Museum of the North exhibit
 UA Museum of the North artist webpage

Artists from Alaska
Writers from Fairbanks, Alaska
1920 births
1998 deaths
Works Progress Administration workers
20th-century American sculptors
Artists from New York City
Writers from New York City
American people of Polish descent
American people of Austrian descent
20th-century American women writers
American women sculptors
20th-century American women artists